The Biblioteca comunale dell'Archiginnasio (Archiginnasio Municipal Library) is a public library in Bologna, Italy. It is located inside the Palace of the Archiginnasio in Bologna since 1838, when a section of the building was destined to preserve the books collected from the closure of the religious orders made by Napoleon. The increase of the collections was pursued by purchasing and by donations from eminent people and scholars of Bologna, among them the cardinal Giuseppe Mezzofanti, Giovanni Gozzadini, Marco Minghetti, Giovanni Pascoli, Jacob Moleschott, Luigi Serra, Laura Bassi, Aurelio Saffi, Riccardo Bacchelli, Pelagio Palagi.

It is the largest library in Emilia-Romagna, it boasts some 850.000 volumes and pamphlets, 2.500 incunabula, 15.000 16th century editions, 8.500 manuscripts and then letters, collections of autographs, prints and drawings, and 250 archives. The library has also a section of 7.500 magazines.

All of this material, handwritten and printed collections are of the utmost importance. They deal mainly with the civil, cultural, religious and social history of Bologna and its territory from the Middle Ages to the present day.

Bibliography

External links 
 http://www.archiginnasio.it

Libraries in Bologna
Education in Bologna
1800 establishments in Italy